Ordizia Kirol Elkartea is a football team based in Ordizia in the autonomous community of Basque Country. Founded in 1941, the team plays in Preferente. The club's home ground is Altamira, which has a capacity of 2,000 spectators.

History
Villafranca Unión Club - (1941-1991)
Ordizia Kirol Elkartea - (1991-currently)

Season to season

12 seasons in Tercera División

References

External links
Official website 
Schedule & Standings

Football clubs in the Basque Country (autonomous community)
Association football clubs established in 1941
Divisiones Regionales de Fútbol clubs
1941 establishments in Spain
Sport in Gipuzkoa